The White Plains Public School District is a public school district located in White Plains, New York.  As of the 2016–2017 school year, the total district enrollment was 7,004 students attending 8 schools in grades Pre-K - 12.  As of 2017, the district superintendent is Dr. Joseph Ricca.

History
Ricca, previously of the East Hanover School District and the Elmsford Union Free School District, became superintendent of White Plains in 2017.

Schools

Universal PreKindergarten (grades: Pre-K)
For the 2018–19 school year, the White Plains Public Schools will collaborate with several White Plains early childhood agencies to provide a free universal pre-kindergarten program to four-year-olds (children born in the year 2014) who reside in the City of White Plains. Transportation is not provided.

FSW - Great Beginnings - Universal Pre-K (UPK)
YMCA - Universal Pre-K (UPK)

Elementary (grades: K-5)

Ridgeway Elementary School
Church Street Elementary School
George Washington Elementary School
Mamaroneck Avenue Elementary School 
Post Road Elementary School

Middle (grades: 6-8)
White Plains Middle School
Eastview Campus (grades: 6th 
Highlands Campus (grades 7–8)

High (grades: 9-12)

White Plains High School
Rochambeau Alternative High School

References

External links
District Website

School districts in New York (state)
Education in White Plains, New York
Education in Westchester County, New York